Peter Karl Christoph von Keith (24 May 1711 – 27 December 1756) was a Prussian statesman, military officer, and confidant of Crown Prince Frederick II, later known as Frederick the Great. Keith was of a branch of the Scottish Clan Keith, which granted him noble status, and was descendant from Scottish emigrants residing in Pomerania. Keith was initially introduced to the Prussian aristocracy by becoming a page to Frederick William I.

Life 
Although born in Farther Pomerania, Keith was ethnically Scottish as his family had come to Pomerania via Sweden, Keith was introduced to Crown Prince Frederick during his time as a page to Frederick William, and by age 17 quickly became close with him due to a mutual fear of the king. There is speculation that Frederick had interest in a homosexual relationship with him, however the matter would never be settled with absolute certainty. He frequently provided the Crown Prince with information regarding his standing with Frederick William.

Although Keith was initially within good standing of Frederick William I, he rapidly fell out of favour once rumour was spread that he had an intimate relationship with the Crown Prince, after which he was promoted to an officer in the army, and was appointed to a regiment close to Cleves in order to separate him from the crown prince.

Later in 1730, Keith briefly returned to Pomerania as he attempted to aid the Crown Prince in his escape to England with Hans Hermann von Katte. Although by the time he arrived the plot was discovered. Keith narrowly evaded treason charges brought down by Frederick William I by fleeing to The Hague seeking the protection of Lord Chesterfield, an English envoy. After which he fled to England. As he no longer could be punished, Frederick William I hanged Keith's effigy symbolically.

He died on 27 December 1756.

Footnotes

Bibliography 
 

18th-century Prussian military personnel
1711 births
1756 deaths
German people of Scottish descent
Prussian Army personnel
Prussian military officers